Echo is a studio album released by jazz pianist Dave Burrell. It was recorded on August 13, 1969, and first released as an LP album by BYG Actuel. It was re-released twice, first again on LP by Get Back Records in 2001 before finding its way to compact disc in 2004 via Sunspots Records.

Burrell had been part of an all-star group led by Archie Shepp that played during the 1969 Pan-African Festival in Algiers. While there, French journalists from Paris were on hand and mentioned to Burrell the possibility recording in the city. Deciding on such a venture, Burrell remarked that he "remembered the sound of the ambulances and the police cars in Algiers and that unstable interval of an augmented fourth and thought that was the interval that I wanted to put into 'Echo'." The recording was Burrell's way of honouring the group, since all were involved in the album.

It has been said that the album as a whole "is [a] monster of an LP" and "a curiously schizophrenic set."

Reception 

AllMusic marvels at the talented ensemble whose members are each "simply blowing or pounding his respective brains out" in the first track that "becomes pleasantly numbing after a while." They even say that "if Echo isn't the noisiest jazz song in the world, it's damned close." The Penguin Guide to Jazz remarks that Echo is "a swirling, all-in blast that palls very quickly." Both sources mention that the second track is more structured and is welcomed after the first song's barrage. Still, The Penguin Guide says that "this is a historical document, hard to listen to now." In response, Burrell has mentioned in interviews that "The French did not know how to record the music, nor did anybody else. The dials were going wild and nobody really knew how to mix it back then."

Track listing 
All tracks by Dave Burrell

"Echo" — 20:21
"Peace" — 22:04

Personnel 
Band:
Dave Burrell — piano, arranger, liner notes
Arthur Jones — saxophone (alto)
Grachan Moncur III — trombone
Sunny Murray — bass, drums
Archie Shepp — saxophone (tenor)
Alan Silva — bass
Clifford Thornton — cornet

Production:
Jacques Bisceglia — coordination
Claude Delcloo  — executive producer
Claude Jauvert  — engineer
Philippe Gras — photography
Jean Luc Young, Jean Georgakarakos — producers

References

External links 
 

1969 albums
Post-bop albums
Free jazz albums
Avant-garde jazz albums
Dave Burrell albums
BYG Actuel albums